Echeneis is a genus of fish in the family Echeneidae, the remoras. The genus is distributed in the Atlantic, Pacific and Indian Oceans.

The generic name Echeneis comes from the Greek echein meaning "to hold" and naus meaning "ship", a reference to the ability of these fish to attach themselves to the hulls of vessels and, in legend, to slow them down.

Species
The currently recognized species in this genus are:
 Echeneis naucrates Linnaeus, 1758 – live sharksucker
 Echeneis neucratoides Zuiew, 1789 – whitefin sharksucker

Fossil species
 †Echeneis urupensis Daniltshenko, 1958 (Miocene of Russia)

References

External links
 
 Echeneis at Zipcodezoo.com

 
Marine fish genera
Taxa named by Carl Linnaeus